Kim Sang-soon (Mookdang) is a contemporary South Korean artist.

Kim graduated from the College of Fine Art, Seoul National University. He was Director of the Oriental painting Department Korea Fine Artist Association from 1980 to 1982.

Today Kim is a member of Oriental Fine Art Association, Fine Art Association and member of the international formative Art Association.

Selected list of exhibitions
 Mooklim (Oriental Painting) Association Members' Exhibition
 Modern Fine Invitation Exhibition (sponsored by the Choseon Daily Co.) (1959)
 International Free-Fine Art Invitation Exhibition (1959)
 Han-kuk (Korea) Oriental Painting Association (1966)
 Korean top senior Fine Artist Exhibition (1975)
 Exchange International Exhibition of Fine Art between Korea and Arabia (1980)
 Korea Modern Fine Art Invitation Exhibition (1982, 1983, 1984, 1985)
 Invitation Exhibition for Korea's 100 Fine Art Representatives (1986)
 Korea Fine Art Exhibition held in Germany (1997)
 Invited Exhibition for New Millennium Korea Total Art (2000)

Prizes
Special Prize from National Art Exhibition (3 times, 1970, 1976, 1977)
 General Prize from National Art Exhibition (2 times, 1974, 1975)

References

External links
 Biography at Artsnet.co.kr
 Portfolio at http://www.artmajeur.com

See also
Korean art
Contemporary culture of South Korea

South Korean contemporary artists
Living people
Year of birth missing (living people)